Turris monilifera is an extinct species of sea snail, a marine gastropod mollusk in the family Turridae, the turrids.

Description
The length of the shell attains 15,2 mm, its maximum diameter is 2 mm; the aperture and the siphonal canal are 8.6 mm long.

(Original description) The shell has a fusiform shape.  The three, conical whorls of the protoconch are smooth.  The next whorls are crossed by twelve or more strong, oblique riblets, which change on fourth or fifth into a row of beaded knobs, forming an angle along middle of whorls, increasing to thirty-five on ninth whorl or body whorl. Above this 
angle are nine or ten fine revolving riblets, and three or four below it, the two posterior being longest, and imperfectly beaded at the suture. On the anterior whorls the medial knobs are sometimes doubled, and on the bod -whorl the revolving riblets are alternately large and small. The siphonal canal is straight, equaling the sub-oval mouth in length. The sinus is deep and is  situated at the angle.

Distribution
Fossils of this marine species were found in Eocene strata in California, USA (age range: 55.8 to 37.2 Ma)

References

 R. E. Dickerson. 1916. Stratigraphy and fauna of the Tejon Eocene of California. University of California Publications Bulletin of the Department of Geology 9(17):363-524

monilifera
Gastropods described in 1894